Jake Taylor (born August 1, 1983) is an American former professional ice hockey defenseman who played in the American Hockey League (AHL). He was selected by the New York Rangers in the 6th round of the 2002 NHL Entry Draft, 177th overall.

Playing career
Taylor began his career in 2000, playing for the Green Bay Gamblers, of the United States Hockey League (USHL).

After being drafted by the New York Rangers in 2002, Taylor completed his junior career, playing his final season with Green Bay, and was the winner of the USHL's Curt Hammer Award in 2002–03, before going on to represent the University of Minnesota the following year.

Taylor turned pro in 2004, he was assigned to the Rangers' AHL affiliates, the Hartford Wolf Pack. He played 43 games for the Wolf Pack in his first season there, registering 3 assists. He would spend the next four years in the Rangers' system, playing for the Wolf Pack and the Charlotte Checkers, their ECHL affiliates.

The 2008–09 season would see Taylor in new surroundings, when he joined the Edmonton Oilers organization, after becoming a free agent. He was assigned to the Springfield Falcons, the Oilers' AHL affiliates, after impressing at training camp. In his two seasons in Springfield, Taylor played a total of 100 games for the Falcons, scoring 1 goal and 10 assists, tallying 11 points.

On July 9, 2010, Taylor and Colin McDonald, a fellow Falcons teammate, were announced as their first-ever players signed up to play for the Oilers' recently reactivated AHL franchise, the Oklahoma City Barons, for their inaugural season.

Awards 
 2002–03: USHL Curt Hammer Award

Career statistics

References

External links

1983 births
American men's ice hockey defensemen
Charlotte Checkers (1993–2010) players
Green Bay Gamblers players
Hartford Wolf Pack players
Ice hockey players from Minnesota
Living people
Minnesota Golden Gophers men's ice hockey players
New York Rangers draft picks
Oklahoma City Barons players
Sportspeople from Rochester, Minnesota
Springfield Falcons players